"Amen" is a traditional gospel song that was popularized by The Impressions with their 1964 version.

It was recorded earlier, in June 1948, and released in January 1949 by the Wings Over Jordan Choir.

Background
The song was arranged by Jester Hairston, for the Sidney Poitier film Lilies of the Field (1963), which popularized the song. Curtis Mayfield said  "I'd gone to see 'Lilies of the Field,' and the song in it, 'Amen,' was very inspiring for me as was the movie . . . Of course, I'd decided to do a version of it.  We put it together in the studio starting off with a musical 'swing low sweet chariot', and then we fell into that particular song with somewhat of a marching rhythm." The song was the first Impressions' hit that Mayfield did not write. Mayfield inserted the title of the song "Keep on Pushing", which was recorded by the Impressions, in-between the lyrics of the song.

The song went to number one on Cashbox Magazine's R&B chart for three weeks and reached #7 on the Billboard Hot 100 singles chart in 1964. The B-side, "Long, Long Winter", peaked at #35 on the Cashbox R&B chart. A new version was released by The Impressions in 1969 under the title "Amen (1970)", reaching #44 on the Billboard Best Selling Soul Singles chart in January 1970.

Cover version
 In 1968, Otis Redding had a posthumous hit with his version of the song, reaching #15 on the R&B chart.
 Elvis Presley would often perform "Amen" as part of a medley with "I Got A Woman" in his live performances from 1972-77.

References

External links
 

1964 singles
The Impressions songs
Otis Redding songs
Music published by Bourne Co. Music Publishers
Songs written by Jester Hairston
1963 songs
American folk songs
Gospel songs
American Christmas songs